The 2016 Asian Youth Beach Handball Championship was the 1st edition of the Asian Youth Beach Handball Championship held from 10 to 16 August 2016 at Pattaya, Thailand under the aegis of Asian Handball Federation. It also acts as the qualification tournament for the 2017 Youth Beach Handball World Championship and the 2018 Summer Youth Olympics.

Format
The tournament was played on the round-robin format. A team had to play match with all the other teams. The final standings were according to the standing in the group table.

Matches were played in sets, the team that wins two sets is the winner of a match. When teams were equal in points the head-to-head result was decisive.

Men

Participating nations
 
 
 
 
  (Host)

Group table

Results

Final standings

Women

Participating nations
 
 
 
  (Host)

Group table

Results

Final standings

References

Handball competitions in Asia
Asian Youth Beach Handball Championship
Beach Handball Championship
International handball competitions hosted by Thailand
Beach handball competitions